Natalia Garbellotto (born 1 February 1984) is a former professional tennis player from Argentina.

Biography
Garbellotto, who was born in Buenos Aires, spent her career on the ITF Circuit. She won seven singles titles and reached a best ranking of 303 in the world.

A right-handed player, Garbellotto represented Argentina at the 2003 Pan American Games in Santo Domingo and in the same year played in a Fed Cup World Group tie for Argentina against Slovenia. In an understrength Argentine Fed Cup side, she was called upon to play the second singles rubber, which she lost to Katarina Srebotnik.

ITF finals

Singles (7–2)

Doubles (1–0)

See also
 List of Argentina Fed Cup team representatives

References

External links
 
 
 

1984 births
Living people
Argentine female tennis players
Pan American Games competitors for Argentina
Tennis players at the 2003 Pan American Games
Tennis players from Buenos Aires
21st-century Argentine women